Rebekah West Harkness (née Semple West; April 17, 1915June 17, 1982) also known as Betty Harkness, was an American composer, socialite, sculptor, dance patron, and philanthropist who founded the Harkness Ballet. In 1947, she married William Hale "Bill" Harkness, an attorney and heir to the Standard Oil fortune of William L. Harkness, which made her one of the wealthiest women in America. In addition to her marriage, Harkness also became well known for her personal eccentricities, as well as her contributions to the arts. She is the inspiration behind Taylor Swift's 2020 song "The Last Great American Dynasty".

Early life
Rebekah Semple West was born in St. Louis, Missouri in 1915.  She was the second daughter of three children to Allen Tarwater West, a stockbroker and co-founder of G. H. Walker & Co., and Rebekah Cook (née Semple) West. Her grandfather founded the St. Louis Union Trust Company. Neither parent was involved in the upbringing of the children, leaving them to be raised primarily by nannies. Harkness took up dancing and ice skating to lose weight and was highly disciplined in both endeavors. She attended the Rossman School and John Burroughs School in St. Louis, and then the Fermata School for Girls in Aiken, South Carolina, which she graduated from in 1932. Harkness was friends with a young Potter Stewart, whom she affectionately called "Potsie," and their relationship was written about by her biographer Craig Unger.

After graduating in 1932, she and a group of female friends formed the Bitch Pack, a sub-culture of local debutantes who enjoyed subverting society events, including lacing punchbowls with mineral oil and performing stripteases on banquet tables. Harkness would also continue to study dance and piano, and studied ballet with Victoria Cassau, who was a student of Anna Pavlova.

Career
In the 1960s, Harkness became well known as a philanthropist and patron of the arts. Through the Rebekah Harkness Foundation, Harkness sponsored Jerome Robbins and the Joffrey Ballet. When the Joffrey Ballet refused to rename their company in Harkness' honor, she withdrew funding and hired most of the Joffrey dancers to her new company, the Harkness Ballet. In addition to founding the Harkness Ballet, Harkness launched a ballet school and home for the company called Harkness House, as well as a refurbished 1,250-seat theater, which presented the Harkness Ballet and other dance companies to New York audiences. Through the William Hale Harkness Foundation, she sponsored construction of a medical research building at the New York Hospital and supported a number of medical research projects.

Later in life, she studied in Fontainebleau, France, with Nadia Boulanger, at the Institut Jaques-Dalcroze in Geneva, and the Mannes College of Music, New York. She also studied orchestration with Lee Hoiby and received a Doctor of Fine Arts degree from the Franklin Pierce College in Rindge, New Hampshire, in 1968.

Public image and philanthropy 
Following the death of her second husband, William Hale Harkness, she inherited his fortune. She soon became the owner of a vast number of properties, and indulged in many luxuries. Harkness' passions for dance and music followed her into adulthood. She used much of her inheritance to become a patron of the ballet, as well as to compose music. Her 1955 tone poem, Safari Suite, was performed at Carnegie Hall, and in 1957 she released an album titled Music With a Heartbeat. Harkness also surrounded herself with other well-known creatives, like yogi B.K.S. Iyengar and Salvador Dalí, who would design her urn upon her death.

Tabloids became fascinated with Harkness as she was known for being an eccentric, who filled her pool with  Dom Pérignon and dyed her neighbor's cat green following an argument.

A philanthropist, Harkness supported the Joffrey Ballet for years, as well as the Harkness Ballet Foundation and the William Hale Harkness Foundation. Harkness later donated $2 million to the William Hale Harkness Medical Research Building at the New York Hospital and supported medical research on Parkinson's disease.

Marriages 
On June 10, 1939, Harkness married Dickson W. Pierce, the son of Thomas M. Pierce. Before their divorce in 1946, they had two children; Allen Pierce (b. 1940) and Anne Terry Pierce (b. 1944). Following the divorce, Harkness gained custody of both children. Allen shot and killed a man in a brawl and was charged with second-degree murder, the charge eventually being reduced to manslaughter, with Allen serving a total of eight years. Anne married Anthony McBride in 1966 and had a severely brain-damaged baby who died at age 10.

On October 1, 1947, Harkness married William Hale Harkness (1900–1954), the son of William Lamon Harkness, both Standard Oil heirs. Before his death in August 1954, they had one child together; Edith Hale Harkness (1948–1982). Edith married Kenneth Perry McKinnon in 1971, and was in and out of mental institutions before eventually completing suicide after many attempts, just months following her mother's death.

In 1961, Harkness married Ben Kean (c. 1912–1993), a physician who was a professor of Tropical Medicine at the Cornell Medical College. They divorced in 1965.

In 1974, she married Niels H. Lauersen, another physician, who was 20 years her junior. They divorced in 1977.

Death
Harkness died of stomach cancer in her Manhattan home on June 17, 1982 at the age of 67. During her final days, Harkness began to reconcile with her children. Following her death, a memorial was held at the family home before Harkness was cremated, and her ashes were placed in a $250,000 spinning urn designed by Salvador Dalí, then placed in the Harkness Mausoleum in Woodlawn Cemetery.

In popular culture
Harkness' "Holiday House" in Watch Hill, Rhode Island was acquired in 2013 by American singer-songwriter Taylor Swift. In 2020, Swift wrote the song "The Last Great American Dynasty" for her eighth studio album Folklore (2020), in which she tells Harkness' life story and draws parallels between Harkness’ highly publicized life and her own.

An American Ballet Story is an upcoming documentary film directed by Leslie Strait and sponsored by the International Documentary Association. It explores the Harkness' legacy and her company, Harkness Ballet.

References

Further reading
 Craig Unger, Blue Blood, St Martins, November, 1989, .

External links 
 Missouri Biographical Dictionary entry on Harkness
 Time Magazine article on Harkness Ballet
 The end of the Harkness years

1982 deaths
1915 births
People from St. Louis
20th-century American philanthropists
Harkness family
People from Manhattan